Rajčić is a Slavic surname that may refer to
Aleksandra Rajčić (born 1996), Serbian artistic gymnast
Ivan Rajčić (born 1981), Croatian  association football player 
Marijana Rajcic (born 1989), Australian association football player 
Marina Rajčić (born 1993), Montenegrin handball goalkeeper

Croatian surnames